Michael Caton (born 21 July 1943) is an Australian television, film and stage actor, comedian and television host, best known for playing Uncle Harry in the Australian television series The Sullivans, Darryl Kerrigan in 1997's low-budget hit film The Castle, and Ted Taylor in the television series Packed to the Rafters. He is married to Helen Esakoff. Caton has been inducted into the Australian Film Walk of Fame in honour of his work in Australia's cinema and television industries. Although he was born in Monto, Queensland, Caton grew up in Woolloongabba. His son Septimus narrates My Kitchen Rules and Robot Wars.

Media career

Television
In 1976 Caton starred as Uncle Harry Sullivan in the long running Channel 9 war family drama The Sullivans.

Caton starred in the Australian drama series Five Mile Creek from 1983 until 1985. He then appeared in the risqué 1990s soap opera Chances (in 1991 and 1992).

Since 1999, Caton has hosted two lifestyle programs – Hot Property and Hot Auctions – on the Seven Network until 2009, and Channel Nine since 2010.

In 2005, he was a contestant on the third series of the Australian version of Dancing with the Stars.

He was in the Channel 7 dramedy Packed to the Rafters, playing Ted Taylor, father of Julie Rafter, and grandfather to all the grandchildren and their partners.

Caton works with the Queensland rugby league team as 'cultural ambassador', a role which he inherited from deceased long-time team manager Dick Turner.

Filmography

Stage
Caton appeared in the 1971 Melbourne production of the rock musical Hair. He has also appeared on stage at the Twelfth Night Theatre. Caton appeared as Sheriff Lavers in the 1982 Sydney Theatre Company production of The Stripper. In 2007–08, Caton appeared in Priscilla Queen of the Desert - the Musical as Bob.

Discography 
Caton, playing in the role of a Priest, is part of the Chorus singing on Jesus Christ Superstar recording (Original Australian Cast Recording), 1972. Caton is the major voice talking in the background on Yesterday's Hero, the hit of John Paul Young from 1975. From Caton's role in the Movie he sings on many tracks on “Ed Kuepper – Last Cab To Darwin - Original Motion Picture Soundtrack”, 2015.

Accolades

References

External links

http://www.centraltelegraph.com.au/story/2010/03/05/day-changed-catons-lives/

1943 births
20th-century Australian male actors
21st-century Australian male actors
Australian male film actors
Australian male television actors
Australian male stage actors
Australian television presenters
Living people
Logie Award winners
Male actors from Queensland
People from Wide Bay–Burnett
Best Actor AACTA Award winners